Monrovia Football Club is a football club based in Monrovia, Liberia. The club´s prior name was FC AK but transformed into Monrovia FC 2010. The club currently tops the table of the First Division in Liberia.

Current squad

Sport in Monrovia
Football clubs in Liberia